Lambert (Lambo) Latham (1768 – September 6, 1781) was a black hero during the American Revolutionary War at the battle at Fort Griswold in Groton, Connecticut on September 6, 1781.  After his commander, Colonel William Ledyard, was killed, Latham continued to fight and was stabbed 33 times by British soldiers. Latham died of his wounds.

References

United States military personnel killed in the American Revolutionary War
 1781 deaths
African Americans in the American Revolution
 Connecticut militiamen in the American Revolution
 Year of birth unknown
 Military personnel from Connecticut
 1768 births
Black Patriots